Flatbush Jewish Journal (FJJ) is a Brooklyn-based weekly newspaper catering to the Orthodox Jewish community. The New York Times demonstrated the paper's political impact in a close senatorial election influenced by FJJ.

Since 2013 the newspaper has featured advertisements from an anonymous source aimed to reduced chatter during Jewish religious services headlined "Stop the Talking in Shul!".

Overview
FJJ publisher Mordy Mehlman founded the paper in 2010 and claims that 19,000 homes receive the FJJ. In 2015 the physical page size shrank due to a change that reduced printing cost.

Local newspapers, including The New York Times, cover their content. For religious reasons, the newspaper refuses to print pictures of women
or girls. If a yartzeit article is published about a woman, the accompanying photo, if present, is of her husband.

One competing periodical referred to them as "my good friends at" and then claimed "inspired by" (themselves). Praise included that the paper "has great coverage of Brooklyn yeshiva events."

Features

FJJ publishes ongoing Torah content by several well-known rabbis; Artscroll books are serialized. Some of their weekly columnists with professional recognition feature a reader's letter and a response, sometimes continued to a following week. Content from Artscroll volumes previously or presently excerpted include writings by or about Yaakov Kamenetsky (Reb Yaakov: The Life and Times of HaGaon Rabbi Yaakov Kamenetsky), Abraham J. Twerski (Letters To My Children) and Avraham Yaakov Pam (The Life and Ideals of Rabbi Avrohom Yaakov Hakohen Pam).

The letter pages were, for ten years, the source of material for Rocky Zweig's submissions, whose presence was described by a larger Orthodox newspaper as "a weekly column." The late Zweig wrote a major satire in the guise of a full page of the Talmud, describing the reasons why Donald Trump should or should not build a wall, and why or why not Mexico should want to pay for it; it was printed as the front page of the Purim issue. The Flatbush Jewish Journal's letter pages are considered important reading: in 2013 a long-time elected legislator's negative reaction to content was covered by The Jewish Press.

Impact of COVID-19
What some labeled a fifty page obituary section in April 2020 was followed up by a shorter one-year-later yartzeit "tribute."

See also
 A Bintel Brief

References

Newspapers published in New York City
Weekly newspapers published in the United States
Jewish newspapers published in the United States
Flatbush, Brooklyn